François Bouvard (c. 1684–1760) was a French composer of the Baroque era. Originally from Lyon, Bouvard began his career as a singer at the Paris Opéra at the age of sixteen. When the quality of his voice deteriorated, he went to study in Rome and devoted himself to playing the violin and composition. His first opera, the tragédie en musique Médus, appeared in Paris in 1702.

Works

Operas
Médus, roi des Mèdes (tragédie en musique, 1702)
Cassandre (tragédie en musique, written in collaboration with Toussaint Bertin de la Doué, 1706)
Saül, ou L'ombre de Samuel (intermèdes for a spoken tragedy by an anonymous author, 1706)
L'école de Mars (divertissement, published 1738)
Diane et l'Amour (idylle héroïque, published 1751)
Le triomphe de l'Hymen et de l'Amour (divertissement)

Other vocal works
Usque quo (oratorio)
L'amour champêtre (cantata)
Airs sérieux avec accompagnement de violon, flûte et basse
Cantata “Le temple de Bacchus” (1745)

Instrumental works
Sonatas for violin and bass (1723)

Sources
Le magazine de l'opéra baroque by Jean-Claude Brenac (in French)

External links
 

1680s births
1760 deaths
Musicians from Lyon
French Baroque composers
French male classical composers
French opera composers
Male opera composers
Year of birth uncertain
18th-century classical composers
18th-century French composers
18th-century French male musicians
17th-century male musicians